Abbas Musa is a Bangladeshi cricketer. He made his List A debut for Partex Sporting Club in the 2019–20 Dhaka Premier Division Cricket League on 15 March 2020. He made his Twenty20 debut on 31 May 2021, for Partex Sporting Club in the 2021 Dhaka Premier Division Twenty20 Cricket League.

References

External links
 

Date of birth missing (living people)
Living people
Bangladeshi cricketers
Partex Sporting Club cricketers
Place of birth missing (living people)
Year of birth missing (living people)